The Chesley Awards were established in 1985 by the Association of Science Fiction and Fantasy Artists to recognize individual artistic works and achievements during a given year. The Chesleys were initially called the ASFA Awards, but were later renamed to honor famed astronomical artist Chesley Bonestell following his death in 1986. The awards are presented annually, typically at the World Science Fiction Convention (Worldcon).

Chesley Award categories
 Chesley Award for Best Cover Illustration – Hardcover
 Chesley Award for Best Cover Illustration – Paperback/Ebook
 Chesley Award for Best Cover Illustration – Magazine
 Chesley Award for Best Interior Illustration
 Chesley Award for Best Three-Dimensional Art
 Chesley Award for Best Color Work – Unpublished
 Chesley Award for Best Monochrome Work – Unpublished
 Chesley Award for Best Product Illustration
 Chesley Award for Best Gaming-Related Illustration
 Chesley Award for Best Art Director
 Chesley Award for Artistic Achievement
 Chesley Award for Contribution to ASFA (through 2006)

Chesley Award results

Award Winners are listed on the ASFA website here:  https://asfa-art.com/the-chesley-awards/past-winners/

Chesley Award Winners & Nominees for 2014

The following are the winners and finalists for works done in 2013 for the 2014 Awards. 

Best Cover Illustration: Hardback Book
 Winner: Todd Lockwood – A Natural History of Dragons by Marie Brennan; Tor, Feb. 2013
Other Nominees:
 Jason Chan – Lost Covenant: A Widdershins Adventure by Ari Marmell; Pyr, Dec. 2013
 Kekai Kotaki – Quintessence by David Walton; Tor, March 2013
 Maurizio Manzieri – Book of Iron by Elizabeth Bear; Subterranean Press, Sept. 2013
 Michael Whelan – A Memory of Light by Robert Jordan & Brandon Sanderson; Tor, Jan. 2013
 Allen Williams – Light Reading, Queen Victoria's Book of Spells, edited by Ellen Datlow and Terri Windling; Tor, March 2013

Best Cover Illustration: Paperback Book
 Winner: Kerem Beyit – The Scroll of Years by Chris Willrich; Pyr, Sept. 2013
Other Nominees:
 Jason Chan – Harbinger by Phillippa Ballantine; Ace, July 2013
 Julie Dillon – Ancient Discovery; Crossed Genres Magazine 2.0 Book One; Crossed Genres Publications, April 2013
 Justin Gerard – Power Under Pressure (The Society of Steam) by Andrew P. Mayer; Pyr, Jan. 2013
 Dehong He – Shield of Sea and Space by Erin Hoffman; Pyr, May 2013

Best Cover Illustration: Magazine
 Winner: Dan Dos Santos – Fables #136 Vertigo, Dec. 2013
Other Nominees:
 Julie Dillon – Elliptic, Clarkesworld, December 2013
 Maurizio Manzieri – The Magazine of Fantasy & Science Fiction, March/April 2013
 Cynthia Sheppard – Bull Spec, Spring 2013

Best Interior Illustration
 Winner: Brian Kesinger – Walking Your Octopus, July 2013; Baby Tattoo Books
Other Nominees:
 Robert Hunt – “Fire Above, Fire Below” by Garth Nix; Tor.com, May 2013
 John Jude Palencar – “A Terror” by Jeffrey Ford; Tor.com, July 2013
 John Picacio – “The Button Man and the Murder Tree” by Cherie Priest; Tor.com, May 2013)
 John Picacio – The Good Life; Popular Science Magazine, June 2013
 Greg Ruth – “Dragonkin” by Lavie Tidhar; Tor.com, July 2013
 Greg Ruth – The Running of the Bulls, The Running of the Bulls by Harry Turtledove; Tor.com, March 2013

Best Three-Dimensional Art
 Winner: Devon Dorrity – Cecaelia, Queen of the Ocean, clay
Other Nominees:
 Thomas Kuebler – Krampus the Yule Lord, mixed
 David Meng – Leatherback, resin
 Michael Parkes – Goddess of the Hunt, 1/2 life-size bronze
 Forest Rogers – Goblin Spider, Kato polyclay
 Vincent Villafranca – Star Smith, bronze

Best Unpublished: Color Work
 Winner: Donato Giancola – Huor and Hurin Approaching Gondolin, oil on linen
Other Nominees:
 Rhea Ewing – Ancestor Series – Neanderthal
 Stephanie Pui-Mun Law – Ships Passing in the Night, watercolor
 Dave Leri – Death Squealer, oil on masonite
 Annie Stegg – Lilaia the Naiad, oil on paper

Best Unpublished: Monochrome Work
 Winner: Ruth Sanderson – The Descent or Persephone, scratchboard
Other Nominees:
 Justin Gerard – The Fox Princess, pencil
 Rebecca Guay – Tender Morsels, graphite
 John Picacio – La Luna
 Travis Lewis – Bone Collector, graphite

Best Product Illustration
 Winner: Julie Bell & Boris Vallejo – Jeannie's Kitten, IlluXCon 6 promotional art
Other Nominees:
 Mitchell Bentley – 2014 Space Art Calendar; Atomic Fly Studios and Alban Lake Publishing, December 2013
 Julie Dillon – 2014 Llewellyn's Astrology Calendar June 2013
 Justin Gerrard – “Morzag! Lord of Destruction” poster
 Iain McCaig – Call of the Muse, Spectrum 20 Call for Entries poster
 John Picacio – El Arpa (Loteria Card Illustration from Lone Boy)

Best Gaming-Related Illustration
 Winner: Lucas Graciano – The Last Stand of Thorin Oakenshield for The Battle of Five Armies Board Game Ares Games
 Winner: Ryan Yee – Fruit of the First Tree for Fate Reforged Magic the Gathering WoTC 2016
Other Nominees:
 Tyler Jacobson – Ruric: Thar the Unbowed (2014 Core Set Magic card) WotC, July 2013
 Todd Lockwood – Observant Alseid (“Theros” Magic card) WotC, Sept. 2013
 David Palumbo – Serene Remembrance (“Gatecrash” Magic card) WotC, Feb. 2013
 Steve Prescott – Prognostic Sphinx (“Theros” Magic card) WotC, Sept. 2013
 Chris Rahn – Ashen Rider (“Theros” Magic card) WotC, Sept. 2013

Best Art Director
 Winner: Irene Gallo – Tor & Tor.com
Other Nominees:
 Lou Anders – Pyr
 Lauren Panepinto – Orbit Books
 William Schafer – Subterranean Press
 Jon Schindehette – Wizards of the Coast

Lifetime Artistic Achievement Award
 Winner: Jim Burns
Other Nominees:
 Kinukyo Craft
 Diane Dillon
 Drew Struzan

Further reading
 The Chesley Awards:  A Retrospective, John Grant and Elizabeth Humphrey. Artists' and Photographers' Press Ltd. 2003 ( It won a Hugo Award in 2004).

References

External links
 ASFA Homepage
Chesley past winners:  https://asfa-art.com/the-chesley-awards/past-winners/
 The Locus Index to SF Awards: Chesley Awards
 
 

 
Science fiction awards
Visual arts awards
Lists of speculative fiction-related award winners and nominees
1985 establishments in the United States
Awards established in 1985